B notation or B-notation may refer to:

 B notation (scientific notation), equivalent to E notation but for base-2 exponents
 B notation (fixed point format), to specify the format of scaled binary fixed-point numbers
 B method, a method of software development